Ciliopagurus shebae is a species of hermit crab native to Madagascar, the Red Sea, Réunion, the Seychelles, and the West Indian Ocean.

References

Hermit crabs
Crustaceans described in 1969
Arthropods of Madagascar
Arthropods of Réunion
Arthropods of Seychelles